The 1915–16 season saw Rochdale compete in the wartime football league, which was set up following the outbreak of World War I. Rochdale competed in the Lancashire section and finished 13th, as well as the Midland Section Northern Division, finishing 5th.

Statistics
												

|}

Competitions

Football League - Lancashire Section

Football League - Midland Section - Northern Division

References

Rochdale A.F.C. seasons
Rochdale